Wilhelm Grosz (11 August 1894 – 10 December 1939) (sometimes credited as Hugh Williams) was an Austrian composer, pianist, and conductor.

Wilhelm Grosz was born in Vienna. He studied music with Richard Robert, Franz Schreker and Guido Adler. In 1921 he was appointed conductor of the Mannheim Opera, but returned to Vienna in 1922, where he worked as a pianist and composer.  From 1927 he was the artistic manager of the Ultraphone Gramophone company in Berlin. In 1933 he became conductor of the Kammerspiele Theater in Vienna.

Forced to flee his native land because of the Nazi takeover, Grosz resettled in England in 1934. However, he found little interest there for his avant garde musical style. He was able to apply a considerable melodic gift to setting the lyrics of popular songs, some of which became international successes. Most of his most popular titles were written with lyricist Jimmy Kennedy: "Harbour Lights", "Red Sails in the Sunset", "When Budapest Was Young", and "Isle of Capri".

Grosz's classical compositions include three operas, two ballets, incidental music for three plays, scores for a number of films, orchestral works, a Symphonic Dance for piano and orchestra, chamber music, piano pieces and songs.

Afrika-Songs, a song cycle for two vocal soloists and chamber ensemble, was first performed in 1930. It utilizes texts by Afro-American poets, mainly Langston Hughes, and a strongly blues-flavored sound. Both Afrika-Songs and a selection of the pop tunes, along with other of Grosz's works, were recorded in the mid-1990s by Decca Records, as part of their series called Entartete Musik (subtitled "Music Suppressed By the Third Reich").

He died in 1939 in New York City.

Selected filmography
 Who Takes Love Seriously? (1931)
 His Majesty and Company (1935)

Sources
Grove's Dictionary of Music and Musicians, 5th ed. 1954

External links

1894 births
1939 deaths
Austrian classical pianists
Male classical pianists
Male conductors (music)
Austrian Jews
Jewish classical composers
Musicians from Vienna
Austrian refugees
Jews who immigrated to the United Kingdom to escape Nazism
Naturalised citizens of the United Kingdom
Austrian male classical composers
Austrian classical composers
20th-century Austrian conductors (music)
20th-century Austrian male musicians
20th-century classical composers
20th-century classical pianists